The Motorola bag phone is the colloquial name for a line of personal transportable cellular telephones manufactured by Motorola, inc. from 1988 to 2000.

Description

Motorola introduced the Bag Phone line in 1988. These phones offered more durability and higher power output (up to 3 watts) than more conventional cell phones of the time, such as Motorola's own DynaTAC and MicroTAC handheld phones, making them popular for truckers, boaters, and people in rural areas. Because of their durability, many examples of these phones are still in working order today.

The Bag Phones are a derivative of the Motorola Tough Talker series of transportable phones, which in turn descended from the DynaTAC car phones introduced in 1984. All of these phones feature a modular design in which the handset attaches to the transceiver, which is then powered by either a vehicle's power system (in the car phones) or a battery pack (in the transportables). By reducing the size and weight of the transceiver and battery pack, and introducing more fashionable bags (originally nylon on the earliest models, but changed to leather in about 1990 or so) in which to contain them, Motorola was able to make them more marketable to the average cellular phone consumer, and hence the Bag Phone.

The handset consists of a digital numeric or alphanumeric display with Pwr (indicating the phone is turned on; indicated by a dot in some models), InUse (indicating that a call is in progress), NoSvc (cannot receive a cellular signal and is unable to make or receive calls), and Roam (accessing a cellular system other than your home system) indicators, a numeric keypad with other buttons for different functions (depending on the model), and a loudspeaker for the ringer and hands-free use. This plugs into the transceiver, which also houses connections for a removable "rubber duck" antenna, and the power supply header which plugs into a 12 volt automotive outlet and an optional 12 volt sealed lead-acid battery. The battery provides up to 2.5 hours of talk time and 48 hours of standby time. All of these parts are put together in a specially designed bag made by either Caseworks, Inc. of Chicago, Illinois, or Service Manufacturing Corporation of Aurora, Illinois. These phones can also be permanently installed in a car. The only Bag Phone to deviate from this architecture was the Power PAK, which placed the controls and display on the transceiver and used an LED display similar to that used in some DynaTAC and MicroTAC phones.

Obsolescence
The majority of Bag Phones operated on the AMPS network, and a few special models produced in the late 1990s,  dubbed the Digital Concert Series, ran on the TDMA network, in addition to AMPS. Because both the AMPS and TDMA networks are extinct as of February 2008, the service life of all Motorola Bag Phones have come to end, and they now serve only as a collector's item.

The original Motorola Bag Phone has been succeeded by the Motorola M800 and M900 Bag Phones, introduced in 2005. While they are technologically dissimilar to the original Bag Phones and use an entirely different user interface, the M800 and M900 support CDMA and GSM, respectively, and add the basic features of modern cell phones. Additionally, they are backwards compatible with batteries for the original Bag Phones.

Design features
Although they are technically all similar, Motorola produced many different models of the bag phone, differing in features and display type. These can be determined by the model number on the underside of the handset, beginning with SCN (TLN on early models). Each type of handset also had its own transceiver, marked with a model number beginning with SUN. Random handsets can be used with random transceivers, but some mismatches may result in unusable functions. For example, plugging a 4500 handset into a 3 Button transceiver will result in the Up/Down, one-touch, VOL and STO buttons to be either unusable or perform a totally different function. Some transceivers will detect a mismatched handset, and display "LOANER" upon power-up.

Display
Most handsets utilized a monochrome LCD display capable of displaying 7 or 10 digits, with green or orange LED backlighting. The better featured handsets used a 7 digit alphanumeric display, and offered a color LCD display as an option.

The color LCD display utilized the colors orange for the alphanumeric display area (red on the Digital Concert Series), green for the power and InUse indicators, red for the NoSvc indicator, and yellow for the Roam indicator. While the color display was more attractive, it has a few downsides. An incandescent lamp is used for backlighting, which not only draws more power, thus reducing battery life in a portable application, but has a definite lifespan. In addition, the display can be hard to read in sunlight, and when the backlight extinguishes during battery operated use, the indicators become nearly invisible.

The America Series 820 and Power PAK bag phone models used an LED display.

Carry case
The Motorola Bag Phone was sold in several types of carry cases ("bags"), with each model being available with one or two types. The earliest bag phones, which used a large transceiver similar to that used in the Tough Talker transportable phone, came in a large upright case, in which the transceiver and battery (if applicable) sat in the bottom of the case, with the handset and hang-up cup assembly placed on top. Later bag phones were available in a smaller upright case, which also contained a side pocket where the battery could be placed.

Other cases available included the Soft-PAK, which houses the transceiver and battery in a large pocket beside the handset, and the Attaché Carry Case, which in addition to a setup similar to the Soft-PAK, contains several pockets for accessories such as a pen, day planner, and the phone's included documentation.

The Dynasty, Meteor, Pulsar, Ambassador II, and America Series AMS833 phones were all available in a unique case which contained a setup similar to the Soft-PAK, and a single pocket on the exterior of the case, and the name of the phone stitched into the case. The Power PAK phone came in a unique case similar to the Soft-PAK, with an external zippered pocket in which to contain the battery.

Model list

Gallery

References

Bag Phone